Żarnowiec Elektrownia Jądrowa is a dismantled former PKP railway station intended to serve the never-completed Żarnowiec Nuclear Power Plant. It lies at one end of a dismantled branch line from Rybno Kaszubskie. It is situated in Kartoszyno near Żarnowiec (Pomeranian Voivodeship), Poland.

Lines crossing the station

References 
Żarnowiec Elektrownia Jądrowa article at Polish Stations Database, URL accessed at 19 March 2006

Railway stations in Pomeranian Voivodeship
Disused railway stations in Pomeranian Voivodeship
Puck County